The Finn Juhl Prize is a design prize awarded annually by the Wilhelm Hansen Foundation to a recipient who has made a special effort in the field of furniture design–with special reference to chairs—such as an architect, manufacturer, writer. Founded in 2003, its name commemorates the Danish architect and furniture designer Finn Juhl. The recipient receives DKK 175,000 (approximately $ 33,000) and the award ceremony takes place at the Ordrupgaard Art Museum north of Copenhagen, Denmark.

Recipients

See also
 Bo Bedre Awards
 Danish modern

References

Design awards
Danish awards
Awards established in 2003
Danish furniture